Joan of Arcadia is an American fantasy family drama television series telling the story of teenager Joan Girardi (Amber Tamblyn), who sees and speaks with God and performs tasks she is given. The series originally aired on Fridays on CBS for two seasons, from September 26, 2003, to April 22, 2005.

The show was praised by critics and won the Humanitas Prize and the People's Choice Award. It was also nominated for an Emmy Award in its first season for Outstanding Drama Series. The title alludes to Joan of Arc and the show takes place in the fictional city of Arcadia, Maryland.

Premise  
Joan Girardi is a 16-year-old teenager living in the fictional town of Arcadia in Maryland. She is the middle child of her family which includes elder brother Kevin, a former jock who has been left a paraplegic after a car accident, and younger brother Luke, a brainy nerd. Joan's father Will is the town's police chief. In the pilot episode, God appears to Joan and reminds her that she promised to do anything he wanted if he would let Kevin survive the car crash. He appears to Joan in the form of various people including small children, teenage boys, elderly ladies, transients, or passersby. Joan is asked by God to perform tasks that often appear to be trivial or inconsequential—such as enrolling in an AP Chemistry class or building a boat—but always end up positively improving a larger situation. 

These plot lines are interwoven with more realistic matters, such as the relationships between the Girardi family. Various storylines that spanned multiple episodes dealt with the consequences of Kevin's accident, Will's job as a police officer, mother Helen's career as an art teacher, and Luke's aspirations to be a scientist.

Characterization of God 
God is portrayed with a very human personality, and does not appear to favor any one particular religion, saying there are "different ways to share the same truth." He quotes Bob Dylan, Emily Dickinson and the Beatles rather than any scripture or verses. The series examines God from a more metaphysical standpoint instead of a religious perspective. 

God is also depicted as having a sharp sense of humor. In the episode "Touch Move", He tells Joan that He has to send her "down there". When Joan is worried He means Hell, He laughs and clarifies He meant the school basement. In another instance, He appears in the form of a woman exercising and says, "Why do people always try and discern my deeper meanings? This is the kind of thinking that starts wars."

Cast and characters

Main cast 
 Joe Mantegna as Will Girardi, the father of Joan, Kevin and Luke. He moved his family from their home in Chicago when he was offered the job of Chief of Police in Arcadia, Maryland. After he busts wide open the internal corruption of the town of Arcadia's infrastructure, the Arcadia Police Department is disbanded and he becomes the Chief of Detectives of the Hogan County Sheriff's Department, which assumed the law enforcement responsibilities for the town. After the departure of Lt. Preston, Will serves as the acting head of the HCSD Arcadia Station. Mantegna had a development deal with CBS and liked the script so agreed to be part of the show. He was also involved in the casting of the other characters.
 Mary Steenburgen as Helen Girardi, Will's wife and mother of Kevin, Joan, Luke. An artist, Helen dropped out of art school after she was raped by an unknown perpetrator. She works as the secretary at Arcadia High School and becomes the art teacher in "State of Grace". She was raised in the Catholic faith but was never confirmed; after moving to Arcadia, she has considered going back to the Church.
 Amber Tamblyn as Joan Girardi, the middle child of the Girardi family who talks to God. He often gives her assignments or tasks that eventually have a (usually) positive outcome, but she is frequently exasperated by the randomness of the directives and God's refusal to answer any direct questions. She has an on-again, off-again romantic relationship with Adam Rove; the two break up in "Trial and Error". As seen in "Drive, He Said", Joan's middle name is Agnes, and her date of birth is November 24, 1987. She works part-time as a retail associate at a local bookstore.
 Jason Ritter as Kevin Girardi, the eldest child in the Girardi family. A year and a half before the events of the pilot, he became a paraplegic in a car accident after failing to stop a friend from drunk driving. A jock, he was supposed to attend the University of Arizona on a baseball scholarship prior to the accident. He initially works for the local newspaper as a fact checker; later, he pursues a career in journalism and becomes a local news anchor.
 Michael Welch as Luke Girardi, the youngest Girardi child. Luke is a science nerd and straight-A student. He has a brief romantic relationship with Glynis Figliola and later begins a relationship with Grace Polk.
 Chris Marquette as Adam Rove (Recurring Season 1; Regular Season 2), Joan's best friend and later boyfriend. Adam is the only child of Elizabeth (deceased) and Carl Rove. Adam is socially awkward and introverted but is also a talented artist and one of Helen's art students.
 Becky Wahlstrom as Grace Polk (Recurring Season 1; Regular Season 2), Adam and Joan's best friend and Luke's eventual girlfriend.  The only child of Sarah and Rabbi Polanski, Grace is outspoken against all authority, with a particular distaste for school vice principal Gavin Price. She is highly intelligent despite her rebellious reputation. After years of putting it off, Grace finally has her bat mitzvah in "The Book of Questions".

Recurring cast 
 David Burke as Father Ken Mallory, Helen's friend and pastor of a nearby church.
 Haylie Duff as Stevie Marx 
 Patrick Fabian as Gavin Price, the vice principal of Arcadia High School who is unpopular among students.
 John Getz as District Attorney Gabe Fellowes, a corrupt public servant who is arrested during an investigation of corruption into the Arcadia city government.
 April Grace as Detective Toni Williams, as Will Girardi's partner on the Arcadia Police Department and later the Hogan County Sheriff's Department in season 1.
 Sprague Grayden as Judith Montgomery, Joan's friend from the summer psychiatric camp.
 Elaine Hendrix as Ms. Lischak, chemistry and physics teacher.
 Aaron Himelstein as Friedman, Luke's best friend.
 Wentworth Miller as Ryan Hunter, a young, charming dot com millionaire who also talks to God, but with his own sinister agenda.
 Derek Morgan as Hogan County Undersheriff Roy Roebuck. He previously served as head of the Arcadia Police Department Internal Affairs Division before being forced to transfer to the Arcadia Fire Department as the arson investigator. After the dissolution of the Arcadia city government, Roy became the Commanding Officer of the Hogan County Sheriff's Department Arcadia Station. He resigns after learning that two of his officers were corrupt and had murdered a witness.
 Erik Palladino as Lt. Michael Daghlian, the senior detective of the Arcadia PD under Chief Will Girardi. He is fired after removing evidence from an official report.
 Sydney Tamiia Poitier as Rebecca Askew, a reporter at the newspaper where Kevin works who becomes involved with him.
 Annie Potts as Lt. Lucy Preston, the former head of the Hogan County Sheriff's Department's Internal Affairs Division. She replaced Undersheriff Roy Roebuck as Commanding Officer of the Hogan County Sheriff's Department. She and Will quickly got close, both professionally and personally, but Will soon became uncomfortable with her methods of policing – and her apparent complicity in the death of Judith Montgomery's murderer. In "Romancing the Joan", Preston transfers to Washington, D.C. for a job with the United States Department of Justice.
 Kevin Rahm as Dana Tuchman, guidance counselor at Arcadia High School.
 Paul Sand as Rabbi Polanski, Grace's father.
 Mark Totty as Detective Carlisle, Will Girardi's junk food-addicted partner on the Hogan County Sheriff's Department.
 Mageina Tovah as Glynis Figliola, Luke's friend and one-time girlfriend.
 Constance Zimmer as Sister Lilly Watters, a former nun who helps advise Helen Girardi and dates Kevin.

Guest cast 
 Michael Badalucco as Father Payne
 Hilary Duff as Dylan Samuels
 Alexis Dziena as Bonnie
 Louise Fletcher as Eva Garrison
 Cloris Leachman as Aunt Olive
 Shelley Long as Miss Candy
 Lauren Mayhew as Elle
 Armin Shimerman as Ronald Harbison
 Tyler James Williams as hallway boy

Incarnations of God 

The many incarnations included:

 Juliette Goglia – Little Girl God
 Kathryn Joosten – Old Lady God, or occasionally as Mrs. Landingham God
 Russ Tamblyn – Dog Walker God
 Kris Lemche – Cute Guy God
 Jeffrey Licon – Goth Kid God
 Keaton Tyndall and Kylie Tyndall – Twin Girl God
 Zachary Quinto – video assignment God
 Adam Richman (from Man v. Food) – a butcher God
 John Marshall Jones – commonly referred to as Chess Player God
 John Kassir – Mime God
 Robert Clendenin – Linesman God
 Roark Critchlow – Newscaster God
 Wendy Worthington – Mailwoman God
 Phill Lewis – Naval Officer God
 Candice Azzara – Housewife God
 David Doty – Businessman God
 Larry Hankin – Homeless Man God
 Chris Hogan – Sidewalk Vendor God
 Oliver Muirhead – Proctor God
 Alphonso McAuley – DJ God
 Thomas Kopache – Creepy Guy God
 Curtis Armstrong -Security Guard God II
 Lindsay Hollister – Computer/Library Girl God
 Fred Stoller – Pizza Delivery God
 Trevor Einhorn – Mascot God
 Ronnie Warner – Street Guitarist God
 Anastasia Baranova – Exchange Student God
 Brian Klugman – Cashier God
 Louis Mustillo – Garbage Man God
 George D. Wallace – Old Man Walker God
 Joel Murray – Balloon Sculptor God
 Erin Chambers – Majorette God
 Susan Sullivan – Rich Woman God
 John Patrick Amedori – Loner Loser Kid God
 Allyce Beasley – Woman with Cats God
 Rick Overton – Bad Stand-Up Comedian God
 Iqbal Theba – East Indian Sunglasses Salesman God
 Rae Allen – Fortune Teller God
 Christy Carlson Romano – Officious Hall Monitor God
 Mike Starr – Big Tough Guy God
 Sonya Eddy – Female Custodian God
 Veanne Cox – Personable Woman God
 Jack Kehler – Electrician God
 Al Mancini – Grandpa God
 Rolando Molina – Trash Man God
 Adam Wylie – Skinny Kid God
 Mark L. Taylor – Salesman God
 Shelly Cole – Punk Girl God
 Don McManus – Park Ranger God
 Jane Morris – Substitute Teacher God
 James Martin Kelly – Sweeper God
 Michael N. Chinyamurindi – Nigerian Doctor God
 John Del Regno – Locksmith God
 Michael Wyle – French Waiter God
 Cal Gibson – Groundskeeper God
 Todd Sherry – Gay Male Secretary God
 Jordan David – Geek God
 will.i.am – Three Card Monte Guy God

Theme song  
The opening credits roll with the song "One of Us" written by Eric Bazilian and performed by Joan Osborne. It was a hit single for Osborne in the United States from her 1995 album Relish:
 What if God was one of us?
 Just a slob like one of us
 Just a stranger on the bus
 Trying to make his way home (repeated)
Osborne re-recorded the song specifically for the show. To fit the lyrics of the song, Joan first meets God as a teenage boy riding to school on the bus with her (although they don't actually speak to each other at the time).

Production

Development 
The idea for Joan of Arcadia took shape during Barbara Hall’s time as a producer on Chicago Hope in the mid-1990s and evolved while she was an executive producer on CBS drama Judging Amy. Hall said "the concept meshed her fascination with Joan of Arc...her longtime interest in physics and metaphysics, and her desire to use drama and comedy to explore the existence of God in a 'scary, not benign universe.'" Hall added, "I started thinking, what would it look like if God tried to contact a teenager today? I made the decision that God would have to come to a teenage girl visually. Joan of Arc heard voices, but kids today aren’t going to hear voices because you’d have to get the iPods off their heads.”

When Hall pitched the series to CBS, she and executives agreed they were not looking to make another Touched by an Angel. Among the differences between the former show and Joan is that the character of Joan is not religious and "the show’s tone is grittier.”

CBS greenlit the show in 2002 "when public discourse about spirituality seemed more gentle: post-9/11 prayer services rather than heated debates over 'The Passion of the Christ.'" The acquisition was made as part of an effort by the network, which was known for its adult-skewing shows, to appeal to younger viewers. Hall developed the series with Hart Hanson and Jim Hayman, her Judging Amy production associates.

As a guideline for the series’ writing staff, Hall wrote a list of "Ten Commandments of Joan of Arcadia", which enumerated what God can and cannot do in the show. These guidelines included points like, "God can never identify one religion as being right," "The job of every human being is to fulfill his or her true nature," "God's purpose for talking to Joan, and to everyone, is to get her (us) to recognize the interconnectedness of all things," and "the exact nature of God is a mystery, and the mystery can never be solved."

Filming 
Though Arcadia itself is set in Maryland, the series was mostly filmed at various Los Angeles locations. Establishing shots of Arcadia's skyline and other outdoor scenes were filmed in the city of Wilmington, Delaware. Scenes at the fictional Arcadia High School were filmed at El Segundo High School in California.

Episodes

Season 1 (2003–04)

Season 2 (2004–05)

Reception

Critical reception 
Joan of Arcadia received widespread acclaim from critics. On review aggregate website Rotten Tomatoes, the first season has a rating of 92% based on 25 critics’ reviews, while Season 2 has a rating of 100% based on 5 reviews.

Greg Braxton of the Los Angeles Times said "the series is a veritable squeezebox of genres...[including] a family drama, a coming-of-age saga of a teenager, a high school drama and a gritty police show, all tossed together with a mix of fantasy and religion.” Robert Lloyd, also of the LA Times, said "the real miracle here is how deftly the show avoids the soggy cliches of redemption so many of its forerunners have embraced." Rob Owen of the Pittsburgh Post-Gazette called it "the best new broadcast series of the season," and the Associated Press said the show has an "intelligent quirkiness." 

James Poniewozik of Time wrote, "[The series'] marriage of the sacred and the mundane has made Arcadia the rare TV show about spirituality to win over both audiences and critics. Whereas its predecessors have been either panned but popular marshmallow halos (Highway to Heaven) or controversial, swiftly canceled critical darlings (Nothing Sacred), Arcadia has avoided, Goldilocks-style, going too soft or too hard.” He also noted that “by separating God from religion, Arcadia takes away what makes faith divisive—a reasonable goal for a major-network series that needs to draw a broad audience to thrive."

Melanie McFarland of the Seattle Post-Intelligencer said, "Only a few episodes into its season, 'Joan' has proved deserving of its growing reputation. It's alive with everything television so desperately lacks: genuine heart, wit devoid of crassness, dramatic situations mirroring so many of our realities that the Girardis sometimes feel more like neighbors than a television family.” Nancy Franklin of The New Yorker opined the show is "both thought through and open-ended, and it should prove especially rewarding for those who think that belief has more to do with asking questions than with getting answers."

Criticism of the series focused on the police procedural plots involving Will Girardi, which many said did not tonally fit with the show. Devin Gordon of Newsweek said that the series' cop drama and its fantasy elements felt like “two shows stitched awkwardly together." Tom Shales of The Washington Post said "the premiere suggests viewers are being asked to wade heart-deep into a drearily portentous muddle.”

Though critics were divided about the show’s tone and plot elements, there was across the board praise for Amber Tamblyn. Poniewozik wrote, "If God, however, is simply asking Joan to do what all teens have to do—develop an identity—Arcadia works because Tamblyn reminds us so well how tough that job is. Joan may talk to God, but she has to do the work her own, mortal self, from accepting life's unfairness to finding her niche at school...Unlike most prime-time teens, Joan is neither a babe nor a brain, neither a Goody Two-Shoes nor a sarcastic rebel. She's the most extraordinarily average teen to crop up on a TV show in years—yet after a few episodes, you realize you would watch her story even if God stopped showing up.” Praise was also given for Mary Steenburgen and Jason Ritter, the latter of whom Robert Bianco of USA Today wrote, "Indeed, the often painfully realistic treatment of the familial anguish that swirls around Kevin (Ritter), who lost the use of his legs in an auto accident, is one of the show's greatest achievements.”

Critics have written retrospectively about the series. In 2015, Margaret Lyons of Vulture wrote, "Somehow Joan of Arcadia is one of vanishingly few shows to bring up two extremely common questions that shape the human condition: 'Is there a God?' and 'Am I a good person?' The answer to both is, it depends whom you ask. And you can only ask so many people in two seasons.” 

Writing for IndieWire, Alison Willmore said "the show balanced [Joan's] missions with the mistakes a well-meaning but impulsive high school girl might make, allowing the show to also be a very fine portrait of life at a certain age."

Nielsen ratings  

Joan of Arcadia debuted on the heels of Touched by an Angel, which had ended its nine-year run in April 2003. An estimated 12 million viewers tuned into the series premiere in September 2003. Though Joan was broadcast in the 8 p.m. time slot on Friday nights, a traditionally quiet night for TV, it became a modest hit for CBS and averaged 10.1 million viewers during its first season. The show regularly drew in young adult viewers for its time slot, which led to NBC changing the schedule for the competing comedy-drama series, Miss Match.

The following year, "viewership sank to 8 million, according to Nielsen Media Research," despite continued critical acclaim which included three Emmy nominations. Partly at the request of the network, Barbara Hall introduced the character of Ryan, a menacing figure and amoral "tempter" (with The Rolling Stones' "Sympathy for the Devil" as his musical motif) seemingly destined to cause a significant amount of conflict for the show's characters.

Cancellation 
While Joan of Arcadia was one of the highest-rated new shows of the 2003–2004 television season, its ratings declined in the second season and it was cancelled by CBS on May 18, 2005. Fan campaigns were created in response in an effort to have the show reinstated. A promotional campaign by CBS sent street teams into cities to do good deeds, such as buying a cold person a cup of coffee. Only two episodes from the second season, "No Future" and "The Rise and Fall of Joan Girardi", were repeated by CBS, with remaining reruns pulled from the schedule. The cancellation meant the show ended on a cliffhanger, with the Ryan character potentially facing off against Joan. Ghost Whisperer took over the show's Friday time slot in September 2005.

After the show's cancellation, props such as pieces of Adam's artwork and Joan's signature messenger bag and costume pieces belonging to cast members were sold on eBay.

Awards and nominations

Home media
CBS Home Entertainment (distributed by Paramount) released both seasons on DVD in Region 1 in 2005 and 2006.

Sony Pictures Home Entertainment released all seasons in Region 2.

On June 6, 2017, CBS Home Entertainment (distributed by Paramount) released Joan of Arcadia: The Complete Series on DVD in Region 1.

Note: each disc in the season, except the last, contains 4 episodes.

See also 
 Eli Stone
 Touched by an Angel
 Promised Land
 Highway to Heaven
 Wonderfalls
 Kevin (Probably) Saves the World
 God Friended Me

References

Further reading 
 Coker, Stephanie L. "Joan of Arcadia: A Modern Maiden on Trial" (in Part 1. Personal and Political Desires). In: Pagès, Meriem and Karolyn Kinane (editors). The Middle Ages on Television: Critical Essays. McFarland & Company, April 16, 2015. , 9780786479412. Start: p. 31.

External links 

 
 

2000s American police procedural television series
2000s American teen drama television series
2003 American television series debuts
2005 American television series endings
American fantasy television series
Angels in television
CBS original programming
Coming-of-age television shows
English-language television shows
Fiction about God
Religious drama television series
Saturn Award-winning television series
Serial drama television series
Television series about families
Television series about teenagers
Television series by CBS Studios
Television series by Sony Pictures Television
Television series created by Barbara Hall (TV producer)
Television shows filmed in Los Angeles
Television shows set in Maryland